Sandoricum beccarianum is a tree in the family Meliaceae. It is named for the Italian botanist Odoardo Beccari.

Description
The flowers are yellow-green to white.

Distribution and habitat
Sandoricum beccarianum grows naturally in Thailand, Sumatra, Peninsular Malaysia and Borneo. Its habitat is peatswamp forests near sea-level.

References

beccarianum
Trees of Thailand
Trees of Sumatra
Trees of Peninsular Malaysia
Trees of Borneo
Plants described in 1874
Taxa named by Henri Ernest Baillon